Peter Boroš (born 17 February 1980) is a retired Slovak footballer who last played as a goalkeeper for FK Dukla Banská Bystrica.

External links
FK Dukla profile 

1980 births
Living people
Slovak footballers
FK Dukla Banská Bystrica players
Nyíregyháza Spartacus FC players
Expatriate footballers in Hungary
Slovak Super Liga players
Association football goalkeepers
Sportspeople from Banská Bystrica